Sedlák (feminine Sedláková) is a Czech surname, which means a 'peasant farmer' or 'freeman farmer' who was relatively wealthy and owned his own land. The name may refer to:

 Adam Sedlák, Czech ice hockey player
 Anthony Sedlak (1983–2012), Canadian chef
 Borek Sedlák (born 1981), Czech ski jumper
 Gabriela Sedláková (born 1968), Czech athlete
 Jan Sedlák (born 1994), Czech footballer
 Justin Sedlák (born 1955), Slovak basketball player
 Kateřina Sedláková (born 1990), Czech basketball player
 Lukáš Sedlák, Czech ice hockey player
 Miroslav Sedlák (born 1993), Slovak footballer
 Nikola Sedlak (born 1983), Serbian chess grandmaster
 Oldřich Sedlák (1922–1985), Czech ice hockey player
 Pavol Sedlák (born 1979), Slovak footballer
 Tomáš Sedlák (born 1983), Slovak footballer
 Wenzel Sedlak (1776–1851), Viennese clarinetist and arranger
 Włodzimierz Sedlak (1911–1993), Polish biochemist

References

Czech-language surnames
Slovak-language surnames
Occupational surnames